Rhodothermus marinus is a species of bacteria. It is obligately aerobic, moderately halophilic, thermophilic, Gram-negative and rod-shaped, about 0.5 μm in diameter and 2-2.5 μm long.

References

Further reading

External links
LPSN
Type strain of Rhodothermus marinus at BacDive -  the Bacterial Diversity Metadatabase

Bacteria described in 1995
Rhodothermota